Robat-e Zafarani (also Romanized as Robāţ-e Za‘farānī and Robāţ Za‘farānī) is a village in Simineh Rud Rural District, in the Central District of Bahar County, Hamadan Province, Iran. At the 2006 census, its population was 1,004, in 272 families.

See also
Robat (disambiguation)

References

Populated places in Bahar County